Steve Kuntz is a retired American soccer player who played professionally in the National Professional Soccer League.

Youth
Kuntz was born and grew up in St. Louis.  He played for Liebe SC, winning the National U-16 (Niotis Cup) championship in 1985.  He attended Saint Louis University, playing on the men's soccer team from 1988 to 1991.  He was a 1991 Second Team All American.  Kuntz graduated in 1992 with a bachelor's degree in finance.  In 1997, St. Louis inducted Kuntz into the Billiken's Athletic Hall of Fame.

Professional
Kuntz began his professional career in 1993 with the St. Louis Ambush of the National Professional Soccer League.  He spent six seasons with the Ambush.  In 1994, Kuntz spent the outdoor season with the Milwaukee Rampage of the USISL.  In 1995, he played for the St. Louis Knights in the USISL Pro League.

References

Living people
1970 births
American soccer players
Milwaukee Rampage players
National Professional Soccer League (1984–2001) players
Saint Louis Billikens men's soccer players
St. Louis Ambush (1992–2000) players
USISL players
USL Second Division players
Soccer players from St. Louis
Association football defenders